Amarhajy Mahamedau (born April 12, 1990, in Dagestan) is a Belarusan and Russian freestyle wrestler. He competed in the men's freestyle 86 kg event at the 2016 Summer Olympics, in which he was eliminated in the round of 16 by J'den Cox.

References

External links

 

1990 births
Living people
Belarusian male sport wrestlers
Olympic wrestlers of Belarus
Wrestlers at the 2016 Summer Olympics